The 2017 Rhode Island Rams football team represented the University of Rhode Island in the 2017 NCAA Division I FCS football season. They were led by fourth-year head coach Jim Fleming and played their home games at Meade Stadium. They were a member of the Colonial Athletic Association. They finished the season 3–8, 2–6 in CAA play to finish in a tie for tenth place.

Schedule

Game summaries

at Central Michigan

Stony Brook

Harvard

at New Hampshire

at Brown

at Maine

Elon

at Albany

James Madison

Villanova

at Towson

References

Rhode Island
Rhode Island Rams football seasons
Rhode Island Rams football